Dutch Lions is the common name for the Netherlands national American football team.

Dutch Lions may also refer to:
 Dutch Lions Capital Group BV, a USA soccer owning group
 Cincinnati Dutch Lions, an amateur soccer team in Cincinnati, Ohio, USA
 Dayton Dutch Lions, an amateur soccer team in Dayton, Ohio, USA
 Houston Dutch Lions, an amateur soccer team in Houston, Texas, USA
 Florida Gulf Coast Dutch Lions, an amateur soccer team in Cape Coral, Florida, USA
 New York City Dutch Lions, an amateur soccer team in New York City, New York, USA